Jeffrey D. Hayden (born September 24, 1966) is a Minnesota politician and former member of the Minnesota Senate. A member of the Minnesota Democratic–Farmer–Labor Party (DFL), he represented District 62, which includes portions of south Minneapolis in Hennepin County in the Twin Cities metropolitan area.

Early life, education, and career
Hayden was born in San Francisco. He worked as a staff aide to Minneapolis City Council member Gary Schiff from 2001-2002. He later attended Bethel University, obtaining a B.A. in communication studies.

Minnesota House of Representatives
Hayden was first elected in 2008, opting to run after incumbent Rep. Neva Walker decided not to seek re-election. He was re-elected in 2010.

Minnesota Senate
On July 25, 2011, Hayden announced that he would run in the October 18, 2011, special election to fill the state senate seat that was vacated by Senator Linda Berglin, who resigned on August 15, 2011, to take a new job with Hennepin County as a health policy program manager. His candidacy was endorsed by the DFL Party on August 27, 2011. On October 18, 2011, he won the special election with 61 percent of the vote over Green Party candidate Farheen Hakeem, Republican candidate Bruce Lundeen, and Independence Party candidate Matt Brillhart. He was re-elected in 2012.

Community involvement
Hayden is a non-profit manager for Hearth Connection, which provides affordable housing advocacy. He is a founding member of the City of Lakes Community Land Trust. He also served on the board of directors of the Bryant Neighborhood Association and of the Powderhorn Park Neighborhood Association, and as board member of Community Action of Minneapolis.

Investigations

In October 2015, a court-sanctioned investigation found Hayden, and his wife Theresa received at least $3,486 in improper reimbursements from a now-defunct nonprofit organization, Community Action of Minneapolis. On August 11, 2020, Mr. Hayden lost the DFL primary to Omar Fateh, a progressive candidate.

References

External links 

 Senator Jeff Hayden official Minnesota Senate website
 Project Votesmart - Rep. Jeff Hayden Profile
 Senator Jeff Hayden official campaign website

1966 births
Living people
Politicians from Minneapolis
African-American state legislators in Minnesota
Democratic Party Minnesota state senators
Bethel University (Minnesota) alumni
Metropolitan State University alumni
21st-century American politicians
21st-century African-American politicians
20th-century African-American people